Myhrvold is a surname. Notable people with the surname include: 

Aage Myhrvold (1918–1987), Norwegian cyclist
Arne Myhrvold (born 1945), Norwegian sports official
Dagmar Myhrvold (1898–1972), Norwegian actress
Mathilde Myhrvold (born 1998), Norwegian cross-country skier
Nathan Myhrvold (born 1959), American business executive
Ole André Myhrvold (born 1978), Norwegian politician